is a Japanese professional sumo wrestler from Asahikawa, Hokkaido. His debut in maezumō was in January 2008, and his first makuuchi division honbasho was the Natsu tournament in May 2018. His highest rank has been maegashira 8. He has one special prize for Fighting Spirit. He is a member of Ōshima stable.

Career

Early career
He was originally a judo practitioner, but was strongly encouraged by his father and sponsors from his hometown of Asahikawa to join sumo which he initially rejected. When asked again by his father after he finished high school, he agreed. He was then accepted to Ōshima stable by Ōshima-oyakata. He was light entering sumo at 83 kg so to add weight he would eat as much and as often as he could even waking up in the middle of the night for snacks to add on the calories. Because of him being so light his oyakata would tell him to imitate Ama later known as Harumafuji who also was a light wrestler. Early on he disliked sumo citing homesickness and the hard life style, he even ran away in the middle of the night to live with one of his friends to get away from sumo. This didn't last long though as he was talked into going back to the stable in time for the next tournament. He was the star of a French documentary, Tu Seras Sumo, or A Normal Life: Chronicle of a Sumo Wrestler, released in 2013, which covered the first nine months of his sumo career in 2008. In July 2014 he made the sekitori ranks for the first time when he was promoted to the jūryō division, but he was demoted back to makushita after only two tournaments. He returned to jūryō in September 2015.

Makuuchi and later career
His first makuuchi division honbasho was the Natsu tournament in May 2018 which he debuted at maegashira 15. He was the first top division wrestler from Hokkaidō since the demotion of Kitakachidoki exactly 20 years earlier, in May 1998, and  the first Hokkaidō native to win promotion to makuuchi since Tatsuhikari in January 1992. In his debut tournament he went 10–5 and was awarded the fighting spirit prize for his efforts, this is his first sanshō (special prize). He was promoted to his highest rank to date of maegashira 8 for the July 2018 tournament, where he scored a make-koshi 6–9. He withdrew from a tournament for the first time in his career in September, after injuring his knees in his Day 3 bout against Daieisho. He returned to the tournament on Day 9, but withdrew again on Day 11 after aggravating the injury. He was demoted to the jūryō division in November 2018 and did not manage to return to makuuchi until almost two years later in September 2020. He withdrew on Day 5 of the September tournament with an Achilles' tendon injury, resulting in demotion back to the second division. 

He was forced to sit out the January 2021 tournament due to a wrestler at Tomozuna stable tested positive for COVID-19. He withdrew from the September 2021 tournament after suffering ligament damage in his left knee, and lost  status after the November 2021 tournament when he could score only 2–13 at the rank of  9.  He withdrew from both the January and March 2022 tournaments partway through after suffering injuries. After having surgery on his knee and sitting out three straight tournaments from May to September 2022,  Kyokutaisei finally returned to competitive action in the November 2022 tournament, having fallen to jonokuchi 5 in the rankings. On Day 8 he defeated Takabahō to move to 4–0, his first kachi-koshi since March 2021, when he was ranked in jūryō.

Having begun his career at Ōshima stable, he was once again a member of Ōshima after February 2022 when his stablemaster renamed it from Tomozuna stable.

Fighting style
Kyokutaisei is unusual in that he prefers a maemitsu grip on his opponent's mawashi or belt – grabbing the front part directly below the stomach area. He is also fond of dashinage techniques, which involve throwing the opponent in a pulling motion. His most common winning kimarite is oshi-dashi, or push out.

Personal
Kyokutaisei registered his marriage to Yoshie Kobayashi on 18 September 2017. The reception was held on 9 June 2018, about 450 guests attended with Hakuhō giving a speech.

Career record

See also
List of active sumo wrestlers
Active special prize winners

References

External links
 

1989 births
Living people
Japanese sumo wrestlers
Sumo people from Hokkaido
People from Asahikawa